Męcikał is a PKP railway station in Męcikał (Pomeranian Voivodeship), Poland.

Lines crossing the station

Train services
The station is served by the following services:
Regional services (R) Chojnice - Brusy - Lipusz - Koscierzyna

References 

Męcikał article at Polish Stations Database, URL accessed at 29 March 2006

Railway stations in Pomeranian Voivodeship
Chojnice County